The Centre for Bhutan Studies and GNH Research (formerly The Centre for Bhutan Studies) is a research institute located in Thimphu, Bhutan, established in 1999 with the purpose of promoting research and scholarship in Bhutan.

The president of the centre is Dasho Karma Ura.

Publications

Periodical
Since 1999 the centre has regularly published an  English language academic journal Journal of Bhutan Studies. PDF copies of articles published in this journal are freely available online. Articles cover not only the history of Bhutan but also issues to do with Gross National Happiness.

Books

See also
 Gross national happiness

References

External links
Centre for Bhutan Studies and GNH Research website

Organisations based in Bhutan
Bhutan studies
Himalayan studies